Laurent Roux (born 3 December 1972 in Cahors) is a French former road bicycle racer.

Doping
In 1999, he was found guilty of using amphetamines and was suspended for six months. In 2002, he was tested non-negative for amphetamines after an out of competition control. In 2006 he also confessed at a doping trial in Bordeaux that he used EPO, human growth hormone, cortisone and testosterone and sold "Pot Belge" to other riders.

Major results

1996
1st, Stage 2b, Route du Sud
1997
1st, Classique des Alpes
1st, Paris–Bourges
1st, Stage 3, Route du Sud
1st, Overall, Tour de l'Avenir
1998
1st, Stage 13, Giro d'Italia
1999
1st, Trophée des Grimpeurs
1st, Stage 4, Paris–Nice
2001
1st, Stage 2, Critérium du Dauphiné Libéré
1st, Stage 3, Route du Sud

Goujounac 
His father, Jacques Roux (1948-2021), was mayor of Goujounac.

See also
 List of doping cases in cycling

References

External links
Palmarès by cyclingbase.com 

1972 births
French male cyclists
Living people
Doping cases in cycling
French Giro d'Italia stage winners
Sportspeople from Lot (department)
Cyclists from Occitania (administrative region)